Bertrand Osborne (18 April 1935 – 4 September 2018) was a British politician from Montserrat. He served as the territory's Chief Minister from 13 November 1996 to 22 August 1997.  He resigned from his post amid demonstrations over his dealings with the British government in the wake of the island nation being ravaged by a volcano eruption.

References

1935 births
Montserratian politicians
2018 deaths
Chief Ministers of Montserrat